Cheung Kwok Ming (Chinese: 張國明; born 23 December 1990 in Hong Kong) is a former Hong Kong professional footballer who currently plays for Hong Kong First Division League club Shatin.

Club career
Cheung started his senior career with Shatin. In 2012, he signed for Sun Hei, where he made 29 appearances and scored 5 goals. After that, he also played for Kitchee, R&F, Biu Chun Glory Sky, Rangers, Pegasus, and Shatin.

References

External links
 HKFA

Hong Kong footballers
Living people
1990 births
Hong Kong First Division League players
Hong Kong Premier League players
Citizen AA players
Sun Hei SC players
Kitchee SC players
R&F (Hong Kong) players
Hong Kong Rangers FC players
TSW Pegasus FC players
Association football defenders
Association football midfielders